Anna Bennett (born 26 February 1976) is a British field hockey player. She competed in the women's tournament at the 1996 Summer Olympics.

References

External links
 

1976 births
Living people
British female field hockey players
Olympic field hockey players of Great Britain
Field hockey players at the 1996 Summer Olympics
Sportspeople from Reading, Berkshire
Commonwealth Games medallists in field hockey
Commonwealth Games silver medallists for England
Field hockey players at the 2002 Commonwealth Games
Medallists at the 2002 Commonwealth Games